Columbus is a statue in Astoria, Queens created by Angelo Racioppi with funds from the New York City Works Progress Administration Art Project. It sits in Columbus Square park. Dedicated in 1941, it is in bronze on a cast stone base. It depicts Christopher Columbus as a young, energetic explorer at the helm. The base the statue sits on suggests the prow of a ship.

History

The origins of the statue lie in the 1920s in the Italian-American community in Long Island and Astoria. It began raising money for the statue, but work stalled when the community couldn't afford a base. By 1930, the Board of Aldermen had renamed the park, on the east side of the Astoria Boulevard (BMT Astoria Line) station, Columbus Square. The statue was dedicated in 1941, but that year it provoked an argument between Queens Borough President George U. Harvey and Parks Commissioner Robert Moses. During World War II, the statue was removed and hidden on fears of being taken for war-use scrap metal. After some years in warehouses and the basement of Queens Borough Hall, it was reinstalled on its base.

References

External links
 New York City Parks and Recreation article

1941 sculptures
Bronze sculptures in New York City
Monuments and memorials in New York City
Outdoor sculptures in New York City
Sculptures of men in New York City
Statues in New York City
Astoria, Queens
Works Progress Administration in New York City